Thomas Chester (c. 1524 – 1583) was the member of Parliament for the constituency of Bristol for the parliament of 1563 and Gloucestershire for the parliament of 1572.

The son of a wealthy [Bristol] merchant William Chester (d. 1558), he served as sheriff of Bristol in 1559 before being elected to parliament for the city in 1567, when [John Walshe] became a judge. He became a major landowner through the purchase of the manor and hundred of Barton Regis. He subsequently bought the manor of [Almondsbury], where he established his family. When 1573 Giles Brydges succeeded to the family peerage, Chester was chosen to replace him as MP for Gloucestershire. He died in Bristol in 1583.

References 

Members of the Parliament of England for Gloucestershire
English MPs 1563–1567
Year of birth unknown
Members of the Parliament of England for Bristol
1520s births
Year of birth uncertain
1583 deaths
English MPs 1572–1583